Chiarugi is an Italian surname. Notable people with the surname include:

 (1901–1960), Italian botanist
Giulio Chiarugi (1859–1944), Italian anatomist and embryologist
Luciano Chiarugi (born 1947), Italian footballer and manager
Vincenzo Chiarugi (1759–1820), Italian physician

Italian-language surnames